The eleventh season of Saturday Night Live, an American sketch comedy series, originally aired in the United States on NBC between November 9, 1985, and May 24, 1986.

Background
Dick Ebersol left the show after the 1984–85 season, when the network refused his request to shut the program down entirely for six months and shift much of the material onto tape, not live broadcast. Once again, NBC briefly considered cancelling the show, but programming head Brandon Tartikoff (who was something of an SNL fan) decided to continue the show and re-hire producer Lorne Michaels.

This season featured a new logo, which was used only for this season: the title, Saturday Night Live in an all caps, graffiti-style pink lettering (not the same logo as used in season6).

Reception
The new cast failed to connect with audiences, due to the cast's inexperience in comedy. The show also featured a frustrated writing crew (including future Simpsons writers Jon Vitti, George Meyer, and John Swartzwelder), who didn't know how to write sketches for such an eclectic cast. The season was plagued by harsh criticism, low ratings, and rumours of a possible cancellation. Tartikoff planned to cancel SNL after its season finale in May 1986; Michaels, however, pleaded with Tartikoff to let the show go on, provided that Lorne find better-suited cast members for the next season.

Notable sketches
Notable moments of the season included when Chevy Chase hosted the show. Chase was not popular with the cast and crew and, according to the book Live From New York: The Uncensored History of Saturday Night Live, Chase pitched an idea for a sketch that featured openly gay cast member Sweeney as a person with AIDS who is weighed by a doctor to see how much weight he lost.

Another notable moment of the season was in the episode hosted by George Wendt. During the show, Francis Ford Coppola appeared in between sketches where he, Michaels and Sweeney try to fix up SNL to boost the show's sagging ratings by turning creative control over to Coppola. With the exception of the "Who Shot C.R.?" storyline back in season6, this episode marks the series' only attempt at extending a plot throughout an episode, as Oscar-winner Coppola turns out to be an incompetent director.

In the season finale, Michaels invited Wayans back to perform stand up on the show, even though he had been fired by Michaels from the show two months prior. According to Wayans, he said there was a "sick side" to Michaels, who loved the rebel. Also, in the final sketch, Billy Martin is shown dumping gasoline around the studio and then setting it on fire. The entire cast is shown to be trapped in a room as a parody of TV show cliffhangers. Credits rolled with question marks on each name, signaling that the viewer didn't know which cast members would be returning the next season. Cast members were reportedly angered by an ending added to the sketch, in which Michaels has the opportunity to rescue the cast from the fire, but chooses to save only Lovitz.

Cast
With Ebersol's cast and writers gone, Michaels hired Academy Award nominee Randy Quaid, best known for his work in The Last Detail and National Lampoon's Vacation; as well as Joan Cusack and Robert Downey Jr. 

Milestones included the hiring of Danitra Vance. While Yvonne Hudson had been a featured player in 1980, and appeared in uncredited bit parts from 1978 to 1980, Vance was the first black female regular cast member. (Vance was also the first non-white lesbian cast member hired on the show and the second overall, joining Denny Dillon.) Terry Sweeney was the first openly gay male cast member (and one of Jean Doumanian's writers during the show's 1980–81 season); and Anthony Michael Hall, then a relatively fresh face from Hollywood, who had appeared with Quaid in Vacation and starred in The Breakfast Club earlier that year. At 17 years old, Hall was the youngest male cast member, beating out Eddie Murphy, who was only 19 when he joined SNL during Jean Doumanian's turbulent, short-lived era (Murphy is still the youngest African-American male cast member). 

Rounding out the cast were unknowns: stand-up comedians Dennis Miller and Damon Wayans and improv comedians Nora Dunn and Jon Lovitz. Don Novello, another member of the old guard, would also return as his popular Father Guido Sarducci character. Writer A. Whitney Brown was also added to the cast mid-season and Al Franken returned in the finale. Wayans, unhappy with the parts he had been getting, decided to play the minor police officer character he'd been assigned in one sketch as a gay stereotype, though it did not fit the role. For this, a furious Michaels fired him.  According to a recent interview with short-term cast member Dan Vitale, actress Anjelica Huston was nearly hired as a cast member this season. Huston, a friend of Lorne's, was begged to join the show as a cast member; instead she co-hosted the season finale with Billy Martin.

Weekend Update
"Saturday Night News" was changed to its original name "Weekend Update" starting with this season. "Weekend Update" proved to be a highlight in the season, with new anchor Dennis Miller (who rarely appeared outside of "Update") becoming the most popular anchor since Chevy Chase in 1975. The only performers to return to the show in the following season would be Brown, Dunn, Lovitz and Miller.

Cast roster

Repertory players
Joan Cusack
Robert Downey Jr.
Nora Dunn
Anthony Michael Hall
Jon Lovitz
Dennis Miller
Randy Quaid
Terry Sweeney
Danitra Vance

Featured players
A. Whitney Brown (first episode: February 22, 1986)
Al Franken (first episode: May 24, 1986)
Don Novello (first episode: November 23, 1985)
Dan Vitale (first episode: November 23, 1985 / final episode: February 8, 1986)
Damon Wayans (final episode: March 15, 1986)

bold denotes Weekend Update anchor

Writers

This season's writers were A. Whitney Brown, Tom Davis, Jim Downey, Jack Handey, Lanier Laney, Carol Leifer, George Meyer, Lorne Michaels, Don Novello, Michael O'Donoghue, R. D. Rosen, Herb Sargent, Suzy Schneider, Robert Smigel, John Swartzwelder, Terry Sweeney, Mark McKinney and Bruce McCulloch. The head writer was Jim Downey.

Episodes

References

11
1985 American television seasons
1986 American television seasons
Saturday Night Live in the 1980s